Hahncappsia lautalis is a moth in the family Crambidae described by Julius Lederer in 1863. It is found in Colombia and Brazil.

References

Moths described in 1863
Pyraustinae